The 2000 United Kingdom Budget, officially known as Budget 2000 - Prudent for a Purpose: Working for a Stronger and Fairer Britain was the formal government budget for the year 2000.

Background 
The millennium year witnessed Britain's major trading partners, particularly the US and several European economies, enter economic difficulties as part of the early 2000s recession. The dot-com bubble burst, though fallout in the United Kingdom was limited. During the autumn, UK fuel protests occurred due to rising petrol prices.

During 1999, net public sector debt stood at £364.4 billion, 34.3 per cent of GDP.

Interest rates had showed greater stability in comparison to the previous year, rising from 5 per cent in June 1999 to 6 per cent in February 2000 where it remained for the rest of the year. Inflation abated further during 1999 which recorded 1.3 per cent (CPI) and 1.5 per cent (RPI).

Budget measures 
The basic rate of income tax was to be reduced from 23 per cent to 22 per cent from April 2000. The married couple's allowance for under-65s and MIRAS mortgage interest relief was to be abolished from April 2000. Fuel duty was to be frozen in real terms. Excise duties on cigarettes were to increase by 5 per cent above inflation. Stamp duties were to be raised. Tax credits and income support were scheduled to be increased. Large increases in NHS spending were forecast. The Climate Change Levy was to be reduced before its introduction in April 2001, with the concomitant cut in employer national insurance contributions instead limited to 0.3 per cent instead of 0.5 per cent.

Details

Tax Revenue

Spending

References 

United Kingdom budgets
2000 in British politics
2000 government budgets
Gordon Brown